Avatha extranea is a species of moth of the family Erebidae. It is found on the Seychelles, where it has been recorded from Mahé and Silhouette.

References

Moths described in 1962
Avatha
Moths of Africa